The luhkka (North Sami luhkka) is an article of winter clothing that covers the top half of a person's body. It is a poncho-like hooded cape with the hem coming down to the wearer's elbow or wrist. Luhkka are made from thick wadmal. It is used by the Sami of northern Scandinavia and Finland and is traditionally worn on top of the Sami gákti or fur coat (beaska).

Sources

Sámi clothing